Veysian District is a district (bakhsh) in Dowreh County, Lorestan Province, Iran. At the 2006 census, its population was 13,029, in 3,065 families.  The District has one city: Veysian. The District contains two rural districts: Shurab Rural District and Veysian Rural District.

Economy
Outside the town of Veysian, the district is primarily agricultural. It is famous for its rice farms, and its farms also produce vegetables.

References 

Districts of Lorestan Province
Dowreh County